Much of the territory of the modern state of Serbia was part of the Roman Empire and later the Eastern Roman Empire. In particular, the region of Central Serbia was under Roman rule for about 800 years (with interruptions), starting from the 1st century BC, interrupted by the arrival of the Slavs into the Balkans during the 6th century, but continued after fall of the First Bulgarian Empire in the early 11th century and permanently ended with the rise of the Second Bulgarian Empire in the late 12th century. The territories were administratively divided into the provinces of Moesia (later Moesia Superior), Pannonia (later Pannonia Inferior) and Dardania. Moesia Superior roughly corresponds to modern Serbia proper; Pannonia Inferior included the eastern part of Serbia proper; Dardania included the western part of Serbia proper. After its reconquest from the Bulgarians by Emperor Basil II in 1018, it was reorganized into the Theme of Bulgaria.

The Danube River influenced the extension of the Roman Empire; its confluents, such as Sava and Morava, affected the growth of frontier fortresses and towns. Many authors and explorers wrote about traces of the Roman Empire on the Danube coast. One of the localities, Felix Romuliana, was ranked on the list of cultural heritage of UNESCO in July 2007.

The location has been invaded by many peoples over the centuries. The northern Serbian city of Sirmium (Sremska Mitrovica) was among the top 4 cities of the late Roman Empire, serving as its capital during the Tetrarchy. 
Contemporary Serbia comprises the classical regions of Moesia, Pannonia, parts of Dalmatia, Dacia and Macedonia.

History

Roman conquest
The Roman Republic conquered the region of Illyria in 168 BC in the aftermath of the Illyrian Wars. "Illyria" was a designation of a roughly defined region of the western Balkans as seen from a Roman perspective, just as Magna Germania is a rough geographic term not delineated by any linguistic or ethnic unity.

The later province of Illyricum was to the west of what is now Serbia.

The Romans conquered parts of Serbia in 167 BC and established the province of Illyricum. What is now central Serbia was conquered in 75 BC when the province of Moesia was established. Srem is conquered by 9 BC and Backa and Banat in 106 AD after the Dacian wars.

The city of Sirmium (Sremska Mitrovica) was among the top four cities of the late Roman Empire, serving as its capital during the Tetrarchy. Contemporary Serbia comprises the classical regions of Moesia, Pannonia, parts of Dalmatia, Dacia and Macedonia.

The chief towns of Upper Moesia in the Principate were: Naissus (modern Niš),  Viminacium (sometimes called municipium Aelium; modern Kostolac), Singidunum (modern Belgrade), Remesiana (modern Bela Palanka)

Many Roman noblemen and statesmen were born in present-day Serbia, including 17 or 18 Roman Emperors (Vetranio wasn't universally recognized as an emperor, but was proclaimed a caesar).

Byzantine period

The Byzantine era in the history Serbia refers to three distinctive periods. The territory of later Serbia was under control of the Eastern Roman Empire up to the beginning of the 7th century. During that period, emperor Justinian I (527–565) oversaw reinforcement of defensive structures in the region, and founded the city of Justiniana Prima, today a Cultural Heritage of Serbia-listed archeological site (Archaeological Sites of Exceptional Importance). In 535, the city became center of the Archbishopric of Justiniana Prima, that had metropolitan jurisdiction over all provinces of the Diocese of Dacia. At the beginning of the 7th century, region was invaded by Avars and Slavs, thus ending the Byzantine rule. From that time, and up to the middle of the 10th century, the region was controlled by the newly created Slavic state - the early medieval Principality of Serbia. In 971–976, Byzantine rule was briefly restored, and Catepanate of Ras was established, but it was short lived. Only after 1018, the territory of Serbia came under the Byzantine rule, and it was included into two themata: the Theme of Serbia and the Theme of Sirmium, that existed until 1071.

Arrival of the Slavs

The Byzantines broadly grouped the numerous Slav tribes into two groups: the Sklavenoi and Antes. Apparently, the Sklavenoi group were based along the middle Danube, whereas the Antes were at the lower Danube, in Scythia Minor. Some, such as Bulgarian scholar Zlatarsky, suggest that the first group settled the western Balkans, whilst offshoots of the Antes settled the eastern regions (roughly speaking). From the Danube, they commenced raiding the Byzantine Empire from the 520s, on an annual basis. They spread about destruction, taking loot and herds of cattle, seizing prisoners and taking fortresses. Often, the Byzantine Empire was stretched defending its rich Asian provinces from Arabs, Persians and Turks. This meant that even numerically small, disorganised early Slavic raids were capable of causing much disruption, but could not capture the larger, fortified cities on the Aegean coast.

The Slavs invaded Balkans during Justinian I rule (527–565), when eventually up to 100,000 Slavs raided Thessalonica. The Western Balkans was settled with Sclaveni (Sklavenoi), the east with Antes.

The Sklavenoi plundered Thrace in 545.
In 551, the Slavs crossed Niš initially headed for Thessalonica, but ended up in Dalmatia. During the 6th and 7th century, Slavic tribes made eight attempts to take Niš and in the final attack in 615 the Slavs took the city.

Menander Protector mentions a King of the Sklavenoi, Daurentius (577-579) that slayed an Avar envoy of Khagan Bayan I. The Avars asked the Slavs to accept the suzerainty of the Avars, he however declined and is reported as saying: "Others do not conquer our land, we conquer theirs [...] so it shall always be for us".

In 577 some 100,000 Slavs poured into Thrace and Illyricum, pillaging cities and settling down.
By the 580s, as the Slav communities on the Danube became larger and more organised, and as the Avars exerted their influence, raids became larger and resulted in permanent settlement. In 586 AD, as many as 100,000 Slav warriors raided Thessaloniki. By 581, many Slavic tribes had settled the land around Thessaloniki, though never taking the city itself, creating a Macedonian Sclavinia. As John of Ephesus tells us in 581: "the accursed people of the Slavs set out and plundered all of Greece, the regions surrounding Thessalonica, and Thrace, taking many towns and castles, laying waste, burning, pillaging, and seizing the whole country." However, John exaggerated the intensity of the Slavic incursions since he was influenced by his confinement in Constantinople from 571 up until 579. Moreover, he perceived the Slavs as God's instrument for punishing the persecutors of the Monophysites. By 586, they managed to raid the western Peloponnese, Attica, Epirus, leaving only the east part of Peloponnese, which was mountainous and inaccessible. In Maurice's Balkan campaigns, the final attempt to restore the northern border was from 591 to 605, when the end of conflicts with Persia allowed Emperor Maurice to transfer units to the north. However he was deposed after a military revolt in 602, and the Danubian frontier collapsed one and a half decades later.

Archaeological evidence in Serbia and Macedonia conclude that the White Serbs may have reached the Balkans earlier than thought, between 550 and 600, as much findings; fibulae and pottery found at Roman forts point at Serb characteristics and thus could have been either part of the Byzantine foedorati or a fraction of the early invading Slavs who upon organizing in their refuge of the Dinarides, formed the ethnogenesis of Serbs and were pardoned by the Byzantine Empire after acknowledging their suzerainty.

Administrative units

Moesia

In ancient geographical sources, Moesia was bounded to the south by the Balkans (Haemus) and Šar mountain (Scardus, Scordus, Scodrus) mountains, to the west by the Drina river (Drinus), on the north by the Danube and on the east by the Euxine (Black Sea). The region was inhabited chiefly by Thracian, Dacian and Illyrian peoples.

The region took its name from the Moesi, a Thraco-Dacian tribe that lived there before the Roman conquest 75 BC-c. 29 BC and formally became a Roman province of that name some years later (by 6 AD).

Cities and towns, in Moesia Superior (at times Macedonia/ Dardania):
Ulpiana (modern Lipljan)
Municipium Dardanicum
Dardapara
Naissus, (modern Nis, Nysus in the Byzantine era)
Theranda (modern Prizren)
Vicianum (modern Vučitrn)
Vindenis
Velanis

Pannonia

The cities and towns in Pannonia, located in modern Serbia, were:
 Acumincum (Stari Slankamen)
 Bassianae (Donji Petrovci)
 Bononia (Banoštor)
 Burgenae (Novi Banovci)
 Cusum (Petrovaradin)
 Rittium (Surduk)
 Singidunum (Beograd)
 Sirmium (Sremska Mitrovica)
 Taurunum (Zemun)

Cultures and tribes

See also
List of Greek and Latin place names in Serbia
Illyro-Roman
Thraco-Roman

References

Sources

 
 
 
 
 
 
 
 
 
 
 
 
 
 
 
 
 
 

 
 
Serbia
Serbia